Labialization is a secondary articulatory feature of sounds in some languages. Labialized sounds involve the lips while the remainder of the oral cavity produces another sound. The term is normally restricted to consonants. When vowels involve the lips, they are called rounded.

The most common labialized consonants are labialized velars. Most other labialized sounds also have simultaneous velarization, and the process may then be more precisely called labio-velarization.

In phonology, labialization may also refer to a type of assimilation process.

Occurrence 

Labialization is the most widespread secondary articulation in the world's languages. It is phonemically contrastive in Northwest Caucasian (e.g. Adyghe), Athabaskan, and Salishan language families, among others. This contrast is reconstructed also for Proto-Indo-European, the common ancestor of the Indo-European languages; and it survives in Latin and some Romance languages. It is also found in the Cushitic and Ethio-Semitic languages.

American English labializes  to various degrees.

A few languages, including Arrernte and Mba, have contrastive labialized forms for almost all of their consonants.

Types

With non-dorsal consonants, labialization may include velarization as well. Labialization is not restricted to lip-rounding. The following articulations have either been described as labialization, or been found as allophonic realizations of prototypical labialization:

 Labiodental frication, found in Abkhaz
 Complete bilabial closure, found in Abkhaz and Ubykh
 "Labialization" (and ) without noticeable rounding (protrusion) of the lips, found in the Iroquoian languages. It may be that they are compressed.
 Rounding without velarization, found in Shona and in the Bzyb dialect of Abkhaz.

Eastern Arrernte has labialization at all places and manners of articulation; this derives historically from adjacent rounded vowels, as is also the case of the Northwest Caucasian languages. Marshallese also has phonemic labialization as a secondary articulation at all places of articulation except for labial consonants and coronal obstruents.

In North America, languages from a number of families have sounds that sound labialized (and vowels that sound rounded) without participation of the lips. See Tillamook language for an example.

Transcription
(Elsewhere this diacritic generally indicates simultaneous labialization and velarization.) There are also diacritics, respectively , to indicate greater or lesser degrees of rounding. These are normally used with vowels, but may occur with consonants.

The extensions to the IPA has two additional symbols for degrees of rounding: Spread  and open-rounded  (as in English). It also has a symbol for labiodentalized sounds, .

However, their chief example is Shona sv and zv, which they transcribe  and  but which actually seem to be whistled sibilants, without necessarily being labialized. Another possibility is to use the IPA diacritic for rounding, distinguishing for example the labialization in English soon  and  swoon. The open rounding of English  is also unvelarized.

Assimilation
Labialization also refers to a specific type of assimilatory process where a given sound become labialized due to the influence of neighboring labial sounds.

In the Northwest Caucasian languages as well as some Australian languages rounding has shifted from the vowels to the consonants, producing a wide range of labialized consonants and leaving in some cases only two phonemic vowels. This appears to have been the case in Ubykh and Eastern Arrernte, for example. The labial vowel sounds usually still remain, but only as allophones next to the now-labial consonant sounds.

Examples

See also
Labio-palatalization (◌ᶣ)

References

Bibliography
Crowley, Terry. (1997) An Introduction to Historical Linguistics. 3rd edition. Oxford University Press.
 
 

 

 
Assimilation (linguistics)
Secondary articulation